Vahide Perçin (born 13 June 1965) is a Turkish actress and television personality. She was credited for a number of years by her married name Vahide Gördüm, but after divorcing, she went back to her birth name.

Early life
Perçin was born on 13 June 1965 in Karşıyaka, İzmir, to a family of Rumelian Turkish ancestry. Her father was a truck driver and her mother a housewife. She studied graphic in high school and then entered the Faculty of Economics but finally started acting. She later attended Dokuz Eylül University's Faculty of Fine Arts and passed all the nine exams of its Theatre School. She finished her studies as the best student and received great support from her teacher Özdemir Nutku. After leaving the university she moved to Ankara. Later she received an offer from the State Theatre and then moved to Adana.

Career
In 2003, Perçin started her television career by portraying Suzan Kozan in the TV series Bir İstanbul Masalı. The Gördüm family later moved to Istanbul and shortly after Perçin portrayed the character Fulya in the TV series Hırsız Polis. In 2006, she starred in the film İlk Aşk alongside Çetin Tekindor. She won the 2007 Golden Boll award for best actress for her performance in the film İlk Aşk. From 2007 to 2010, she acted in the series Annem and played the leading role Zeynep Eğilmez. In 2010, she was cast in cinema movie Zephyr. The film was selected for the 47th Antalya "Golden Orange" International Film Festival and the 35th Toronto International Film Festival, where it premiered. Perçin later appeared in the TV series Adını Feriha Koydum and portrayed one of the leading roles alongside Hazal Kaya. She later left the series after the second season's conclusion due to health reasons. 

In 2012, Perçin starred in the series Merhaba Hayat which is based on the original American series Private Practice. She shared the leading role with Yetkin Dikinciler, Seda Güven, Nihan Büyükağaç, Yasemin Sanino, Melike Güner and Keremcem. On 13 January 2013, the series concluded after 13 episodes. Perçin joined the cast of the TV series Muhteşem Yüzyıl as Hürrem Sultan in June 2013 after Meryem Uzerli left the series due to health reasons.

Personal life
In 1991, Perçin married the actor Altan Gördüm and started to be credited by his surname. Their only child Alize, who is also an actress, was born in 1994. They divorced in 2013. In 2011, Perçin was diagnosed with breast cancer and received medical treatment shortly after.

Filmography

Awards

References

External links
 
	

Living people
1965 births
Turkish film actresses
Turkish television actresses
Actresses from İzmir
20th-century Turkish actresses
21st-century Turkish actresses